Judex (real name Jacques de Trémeuse) is a fictional French vigilante hero created by Louis Feuillade and Arthur Bernède for the 1916 silent film Judex. Judex (whose name is Latin for "judge") is a mysterious avenger who dresses in black and wears a slouch hat and cloak. He was originally conceived as a heroic version of the criminal character Fantômas. (Feuillade had directed the popular 1913 serial Fantômas.) The character has since appeared in other films, in novels, on stage and in comic books. Judex appears to have been an inspiration for the American pulp hero The Shadow, who was himself an inspiration for Batman.

Creation

Louis Feuillade had already made two earlier serials, Fantômas (1913) and Les Vampires (1915), which were popular with audiences, but drew criticism for glorifying criminals. As a consequence Feuillade decide to create a heroic persona, Judex, but one who had all of the sinister trappings of the flamboyant villains who were popular at the time. Judex was conceived by Feuillade and novelist Arthur Bernède, who also published a novel based on the script and adapted the original film for the stage in 1923.

Description
After his father committed suicide as a result of being ruined by the villainous banker Favraux, Jacques de Trémeuse adopted the guise of Judex and assembled an organization of ex-criminals and circus people to bring down Favraux and his lethal mistress Marie Verdier. He anticipated later pulp heroes and superheroes in many respects. He was a masterful fighter and an expert at disguise, and boasted a secret headquarters. In the subterranean passages beneath a ruined castle Judex had a base outfitted with technological gadgets. He also had a secret identity: "Judex" (the Latin word for judge) was merely a nom de guerre he had adopted in his quest for revenge. Although the original Judex serial derived from the first Fantômas also directed by Louis Feuillade, the story bore several similarities with The Count of Monte Cristo.

While in the first serial, Judex acted solely out of personal revenge, the second one, Judex's New Mission, showed him acting as a vigilante and a defender of the innocent.

Films
The character Judex first appeared in the 1916 serial film Judex. Though Judex was made in 1914, the outbreak of World War I delayed its release.  It finally premiered in December 1916, and subsequently went into wider release in 1917–1918.

A sequel serial titled Judex's New Mission (La Nouvelle Mission de Judex)  was released in 1917.

A remake, also named Judex, was made in 1934, directed by Maurice Champreux, and starring René Ferté as Judex.

Another remake, again named Judex, was filmed in 1963 by director Georges Franju. The story was shortened and simplified but remained true to the original. American magician Channing Pollock played the title role.

Cast

Books

Novels
Judex: Published in 1917, by Arthur Bernède and Louis Feuillade, based on the 1916 serial, and reissued in 1925 as Les Nouveaux Exploits de Judex (Judex's New Adventures). Black Coat Press published an adaptation by Rick Lai in 2012.

Judex' New Mission: Published in 1919, by Arthur Bernède and Louis Feuillade, based on the 1918 serial,  and reissued 1925 as La Dernière Incarnation de Judex (Judex's Last Incarnation).  Black Coat Press published an adaptation by Rick Lai in 2013, titled The Return of Judex.

In 2013, Black Coat Press published a new screenplay by Robert L. Robinson, Jr., of a new adaptation of the Judex character.

Short stories
Tales of the Shadowmen, Volume 1: The Modern Babylon: Published in 2005, Judex appears in two short stories, "Mask of the Monster" by Matthew Baugh, and "Penumbra" by Chris Roberson.

Tales of the Shadowmen, Volume 2: Gentlemen of the Night: Published in 2006, Judex appears in one short story, "Lost and Found" by Jean-Marc Lofficier.

Tales of the Shadowmen, Volume 3: Danse Macabre: Published in 2007, Judex appears in one short story, "Two Hunters" by Robert L. Robinson, Jr.

Tales of the Shadowmen, Volume 7: Femmes Fatales: Published in 2010, Judex appears in two short stories, "What Rough Beast" by Matthew Baugh and "Faces of Fear" by Matthew Dennion

Tales of the Shadowmen, Volume 8: Agents Provocateurs: Published in 2011, Judex appears in two short stories,  "Judex vs Belphegor" by John Gallagher and "The Affair of the Necklace Revisited" by Jean-Marc Lofficier & Randy Lofficier

Night of the Nyctalope: Published in 2012, Judex appears in one short story, "Justice and Power" by Christofer Nigro

The Shadow of Judex: Published in 2013.  Contains all the above Judex short stories and 16 additional ones.

Reference books
Shadowmen: Heroes and Villains of French Pulp Fiction: Published in 2003, by Jean-Marc Lofficier and Randy Lofficier, published by Black Coat Press is an encyclopedic guide to some of the most important characters from French Fiction, including Judex.

Comics
French comic magazine Hurrah! published by Editions Mondiales in June 1940 began a comic series of Judex, which was in actuality, a French translation of the American syndicated Shadow comic strip.

As an homage, writer Matt Fraction featured Judex as a member of a team of European superheroes of the early 20th century, in a 2012 issue of The Defenders.

References

External links
 Coolfrenchcomics Judex Page
 Internationalhero Judex page
 Penumbra by Chris Roberson
 The Judex Codex by Dennis Power

Movies

  
  
  
 

Characters in pulp fiction
Characters in French novels of the 20th century
Fictional amateur detectives
Fictional French people
Film serial characters